Jičín Airport  is a public aerodrome with civil traffic. The airport is plentifully used for sport flying and sightseeing flights above Prachov Rocks eventually the Giant Mountains.

Local Traffic Regulations and Restrictions
The airport is designed for use by VFR flights in the day time and parachute jumping operation. Operational hours are 8:00-15:00 UTC in SAT, SUN, HOL from 15 April to 15 October. Outside operational hours arrivals are permitted only by prior arrangement with airfield operator (check on a serviceability of movement areas). Arrivals of aircraft without two-way radio communication are possible only by previous agreement with airfield operator.

Operation data 
Traffic circuits: RWY 12 right hand / RWY 30 left hand
Traffic circuits altitude: 1900 ft/580m AMSL
Frequency: 118,080 MHz (Jičín RADIO)

References

External links
 Website of Jičín airport
 Aeroclub Jičín
 Flight school Tec-Air

Tourism in the Czech Republic
Airports in the Czech Republic
1947 establishments in Czechoslovakia
Airports established in 1947
20th-century architecture in the Czech Republic